Waseluddin Ahmed (born 1 January 1986) is a Bangladeshi first-class and List A cricketer.  He is a right-handed batsman and right arm medium pace bowler.

Career
Ahmed made his debut for Chittagong Division in 2002/03 and played through the 2006/07 season. He played for Bangladesh A in 2004/05 and in Under-19 ODIs for Bangladesh Under-19s in 2001/02.

He has made 2 first-class fifties, with a best of 74 against Khulna Division and took 3 for 36 against Barisal Division. His best limited overs score is a knock of 49* against Zimbabwe A.

References

1982 births
20th-century Bangladeshi people
21st-century Bangladeshi people
20th-century Bengalis
21st-century Bengalis
Bangladeshi cricketers
Chittagong Division cricketers
Living people
People from Chittagong